Nistor Văidean (born 1 October 1961) is a Romanian former football midfielder. He wrote a book which was released in 2010 called Bucuria unui copil despre care se credea că nu va mai juca fotbal niciodată (The joy of a child who it was fought that he would never play football again).

International career
Nistor Văidean made two appearances at international level for Romania in two friendlies against Iraq.

Honours
FCM Brașov
Divizia B: 1983–84
Dinamo București
Cupa României: 1985–86

References

External links

Nistor Văidean at Magyarfutball.hu

1961 births
Living people
Romanian footballers
Romania international footballers
Association football goalkeepers
Liga I players
Liga II players
Nemzeti Bajnokság I players
FC Brașov (1936) players
FC Dinamo București players
CSM Flacăra Moreni players
Győri ETO FC players
Romanian expatriate footballers
Expatriate footballers in Hungary
Romanian expatriate sportspeople in Hungary
Romanian writers
21st-century Romanian writers
Romanian male writers